Charles Henry Welch (called C. H. Welch) (1880–1967) was a Christian dispensational theologian, writer and speaker.

During his lifetime he produced over 60 books, booklets and pamphlets, and more than 500 audio recordings. His most significant works are 56 bound volumes of the Berean Expositor, a Bible study magazine edited by Mr. Welch from 1906 until his death in 1967, and 10 volumes of The Alphabetical Analysis.
He also taught his dispensational approach of the Bible with lectures throughout Great Britain, the Netherlands, France, Canada and the United States.

Welch promoted the Acts 28 position which he believed "is indeed of the utmost dispensational importance to the believer today. It marks a frontier." He believed the dispensational truths of the Acts period (29 – 62 AD) differed greatly from those written after the Acts period, (see Meeting with Dr. Bullinger below).

Early life
C. H. Welch was born in London, England on 25 April 1880. When he left school at 14 Welch entered the leatherwork trade, his father's occupation, and remained in the industry until 1904, age 24.

In addition, his early years were influenced by the study of art at the Bermondsey Settlement.

From November 1900, he became a Christian after hearing an address by Dr. L. W. Munhall, (M.A.) titled "Sceptics and the Bible". He was amazed as he "listened to a man who was most evidently sane and scholarly, actually maintaining that the Scriptures were true!"

Bible Training College
After his conversion to Christianity, young Welch actively attended church and various Christian meetings and lectures. During one of the classes he received a prize for writing “The Figurative Language of Scripture”. Afterwards Welch was offered a position at the Bible Training College of London as part-time general secretary. While attending the college he studied advanced Greek and Hebrew, while teaching an elementary Greek class. It was during this time that Welch began to develop his dispensational approach to the Bible.

As his knowledge of the Scriptures grew, Welch disagreed with the direction of the Bible Training College which was forming a primitive church based upon the Sermon on the Mount and Acts chapters 1 and 2. As a result of this conflict, Welch resigned in 1907 and began meeting with a small Bible study group. It was during this time that he created The Berean Expositor.

Meeting with Dr. E. W. Bullinger
After his resignation from the Bible Training College in 1908, Welch read an article in Dr. Bullinger's "Things To Come" which he believed contained an anomaly; namely, if Israel had been set aside in God's plans at Acts 28:24–28 (approximately 62 AD), then the epistles of the New Testament written before and after this event should reflect such a change.

Welch wrote to Bullinger and soon met with him to discuss the relation of Paul's 14 epistles to the boundary line of Acts 28. Although Bullinger had written many times previously concerning Israel's setting aside in God's dealings at Acts 28, he had continued to write about the New Testament epistles without reconciling the fact that some were written before, and some after Acts chapter 28.

At this meeting, Welch put forth the idea to the man for whom he had so much respect. Mr. Welch records that after pondering his proposal, Dr. Bullinger declared, "That scraps half the books I've written. But we want the Truth, and the Truth is in what you have said." Dr. Bullinger agreed, the place of Acts 28 indeed had an important bearing on interpreting the New Testament. Then they both "discussed implications that arise from observing the relation of Paul's epistles to that boundary line" as follows: 

Although Dr. Bullinger died four and half years after the meeting, his last book, Foundations of Dispensational Truth reflected his understanding and acceptance of the division of the Pauline epistles written before and after the Acts 28 dividing line.

After the meeting
When Dr. Bullinger was writing The Companion Bible there was little time to continue his Things to Come journal. As a result, he asked Welch to take over as editor. His first article was titled, "The Unity of the Spirit (Eph 4:3): What is it?". He continued to write dispensational expositions in the journal until it ceased publication in 1915.

Although incomplete at his death, Dr. Bullinger's Companion Bible was fully published in 1922. Within The Companion Bible's appendixes is written an exposition by C.H. Welch titled, The Eight Parables of the Kingdom of Heaven in Matt. 13, Appendix 145. Although Welch wrote 24 more articles for the Appendixes related to the Acts 28 position, this was the only article published. Perplexed, Welch wrote to the committee in charge of completing The Companion Bible for an explanation. Their response was: "We do not know what Dr. Bullinger would have written, we can only go back and adopt what he has already written, although his last book, The Foundations of Dispensational Truth proves that he fully accepted Acts 28 as the dispensational boundary and the segregation of The Prison Epistles."

In 1943, Welch adopted the Wilson St. Chapel in London as his church building, which he renamed The Chapel of the Opened Book. To preserve Welch's works and research, The Berean Publishing Trust and The Berean Forward Movement were established.

Works
Apostle of the Reconciliation (1923) 
Testimony of the Lord's Prisoner (1931) 
Just and the Justifier (1948) 
Life Through His Name (1953) 
'Dispensational Truth: Or, The Place of Israel and the Church in the Purpose of the Ages’ (1959) 
Published posthumously, after Welch's death on 11 November 1967 
In Heavenly Places: An Exposition of the Epistle to the Ephesians (1968) 
United Yet Divided (1976) 
The Berean Expositor, volumes 1–56 
From Pentecost to Prison, or The Acts of the Apostles, (1996) 
Perfection or Perdition: An Exposition of the Book of Hebrews (1970) 
Form of Sound Words, (1997) 
Welch's magazine continues to publish his works

References

External links
 Charles Henry Welch website
 Writings
 Audio recordings

1880 births
1967 deaths
English religious writers
English theologians